Goon Dip Mountain is a summit in Sitka City and Borough, Alaska, in the United States.

Goon Dip Mountain was named in 1939 for Goon Dip, a Chinese American diplomat and mine official who died in 1936.

References

Mountains of Sitka, Alaska
Mountains of Alaska